"Pretty Girls Everywhere" is a song written by Eugene Church and Thomas Williams.

The song was first a hit for the American singer Eugene Church with his group The Fellows (including session drummer Earl Palmer) in 1958.  Church's recording for Class records was his most popular reaching #6 R&B and #36 Pop in the US.

Walker Brothers recording
In 1965, "Pretty Girls Everywhere" was later recorded and released by the American pop group The Walker Brothers as their début single. The Walker Brothers' version is notable as it captures the group just before Scott Walker became the lead singer. In his place John Walker is more dominant in a brassy Beat music arrangement. The single is backed with Scott Walker's first composing credit "Doin' the Jerk". The group can be seen miming "Doin' the Jerk" on the 1965 beach party movie Beach Ball. In spite of the movie publicity the single did not chart in any territory.

Track listing

Otis Spann recording
While touring Britain with the Muddy Waters Blues Band in 1964 piano player Otis Spann recorded a version of the song.  The song was released in 1967 on the Decca Records compilation ‘’Raw Blues’’.  The band for that session included Spann on piano, Eric Clapton on guitar, Muddy Waters on guitar, Ransom Knowling, on bass and Willie "Big Eyes" Smith on drums.  The recording occurred on May 4, at the Decca Studios in London, the producer was Mike Vernon and the engineers were Roy Baker and Gus Dudgeon.

References

1958 songs
1958 singles
1965 debut singles
The Walker Brothers songs
Philips Records singles
Smash Records singles